Brodiaea orcuttii is a species of flowering plant in the family Asparagaceae, subfamily Brodiaeoideae. It is a cluster-lily known by the common name Orcutt's brodiaea. The bulb is native to Southern California, mainly San Diego County, where it is an uncommon species. Its range probably extends into Baja California.

Description
Brodiaea orcuttii is a perennial producing an inflorescence up to 25 centimeters tall which bears flowers on pedicels each a few centimeters long. The flower has six purple tepals each between 1 and 2 centimeters long. This is the only brodiaea that lacks staminodes.

References

External links
Jepson Manual Treatment
USDA Plants Profile
Flora of North America
Photo gallery

orcuttii
Flora of California
Flora of Baja California
Natural history of the California chaparral and woodlands
Natural history of the Peninsular Ranges
Taxa named by John Gilbert Baker
Taxa named by Edward Lee Greene